The 1974 Rothmans Canadian Open was a tennis tournament played on outdoor clay courts at the Toronto Cricket Skating and Curling Club in Toronto in Canada that was part of the 1974 Commercial Union Assurance Grand Prix and of the 1974 WTA Tour. The tournament was held from August 12 through August 18, 1974.

Finals

Men's singles
 Guillermo Vilas defeated  Manuel Orantes 6–4, 6–2, 6–3
 It was Vilas' 5th title of the year and the 7th of his career.

Women's singles
 Chris Evert defeated  Julie Heldman 6–0, 6–3
 It was Evert's 16th title of the year and the 36th of her career.

Men's doubles
 Manuel Orantes /  Guillermo Vilas defeated  Jürgen Fassbender /  Hans-Jürgen Pohmann 6–1, 2–6, 6–2
 It was Orantes' 3rd title of the year and the 23rd of his career. It was Vilas' 6th title of the year and the 8th of his career.

Women's doubles
 Gail Chanfreau /  Julie Heldman defeated  Chris Evert /  Jeanne Evert 6–3, 6–4
 It was Chanfreau's 1st title of the year and the 1st of her career. It was Heldman's 1st title of the year and the 1st of her career.

References

External links
 
 Association of Tennis Professionals (ATP) tournament profile
 Women's Tennis Association (WTA) tournament profile

Rothmans Canadian Open
Rothmans Canadian Open
Rothmans Canadian Open
Rothmans Canadian Open
Canadian Open (tennis)